Edward Bayley may refer to:

Edward Hodson Bayley (1841–1938), British businessman and politician
Edward Clive Bayley (1821–1884), Anglo-Indian civil servant, statesman and archæologist

See also
Edward Bailey (disambiguation)
Edward Baily (disambiguation)